Cinnabar is the common bright scarlet to brick-red form of mercury(II) sulfide.

Cinnabar may also refer to:

 Cinnabar, the color of the mineral
 Cinnabar, Queensland, a locality in the Gympie Region, Queensland, Australia
 Cinnabar moth (Tyria jacobaeae), a brightly coloured arctiid moth
 Cinnabar Theater, a theater in Petaluma, California, USA
 Cinnabar, Montana, a USA ghost town and railroad terminus